The Republic XP-72 was an American prototype fighter-interceptor developed by Republic Aircraft as a progression of the P-47 Thunderbolt design. The XP-72 was designed around the Pratt & Whitney R-4360 Wasp Major 28-cylinder air-cooled radial engine with a supercharger mounted behind the pilot and driven by an extension shaft from the engine. The armament consisted of six .50 caliber (12.7 mm) wing-mounted Browning AN/M2 machine guns and underwing racks for two 1,000 lb bombs; Alternative armament packages included two 37 mm M4 autocannons with four  .50 caliber AN/M2s, or four M4 autocannons.

Design and development

The XP-72 development paralleled that of another Republic design, the XP-69 that was to be powered by an experimental 42-cylinder Wright R-2160 liquid-cooled inline radial engine mounted in the nose of the aircraft and driving contra-rotating propellers. The XP-69 was intended for high altitude operations and featured a pressurized cockpit and armament of two 37 mm cannon and four 50 caliber machine guns. As the XP-72 displayed greater promise than the XP-69, the XP-69 was cancelled on 11 May 1943 and an order for two XP-72 prototypes was placed on 18 June 1943.

Operational history
The XP-72 flew for the first time on 2 February 1944, equipped with a four-bladed propeller. The second prototype was completed on 26 June 1944 and was equipped with an Aero-Products contra-rotating propeller. As the XP-72 displayed exceptional performance during flight tests, an order for 100 production aircraft was awarded. The order included an alternate armament configuration of four 37 mm cannon. By this time, World War II had progressed to where the need was for long-range escort fighters and not high-speed interceptors. Furthermore, the advent of the new turbojet-powered interceptors showed greater promise for the interceptor role. Thus, the production order for the P-72 was cancelled.

Specifications (XP-72)

See also

References

Notes

Citations

Bibliography

 Bodie, Warren. "The Whine of the Jug". Wings Magazine (Vol. 4, No. 4), August 1974, pp. 33–39.
 Freeman, Roger A. Thunderbolt: A Documentary History of the Republic P-47. London: Macdonald & Jane's (Publishers) Ltd., 1978. .
 Green, William. War Planes of the Second World War - Fighters (Volume Four). London: Macdonald & Co.(Publishers) Ltd., 1961. .
 Green, William and Gordon Swanborough. WW2 Aircraft Fact Files: US Army Air Force Fighters, Part 2. London: Macdonald & Jane's (Publishers) Ltd., 1978. .
 Jarski, Adam and Robert Michulec. P-47 Thunderbolt, P-35/P-43/XP-72 (Monografie Lotnicze 26) (in Polish). Gdynia: AJ-Press, 1996. .

External links

P-072
Republic P-72
Single-engined tractor aircraft
Aircraft with contra-rotating propellers
Low-wing aircraft
Aircraft first flown in 1944